Superstrada Pedemontana Veneta is a motorway owned by the Region of Veneto in toll concession. It does not have an alphanumeric classification like the other Italian motorways, but is identified by the abbreviation SPV.

References 

RA12
Transport in Veneto
Buildings and structures completed in 2019
2019 establishments in Italy